Aivukus is an extinct genus of walrus from the Miocene.

Etymology
The generic name is derived from the Inuit word for walrus, aivuk.

Description
From fossil records it was at least as big as, if not slightly bigger than, the modern walrus, and, like the modern walrus, was probably a molluscivore.

Sources

 Marine Mammals: Evolutionary Biology by Annalisa Berta, James L. Sumich
 Encyclopedia of Marine Mammals by William F. Perrin, Bernd Wursig, and J. G.M. Thewissen

Miocene pinnipeds
Prehistoric carnivoran genera
Fossils of Mexico
Odobenids
Fossil taxa described in 1977